The ackee, also known as ankye, achee, akee, ackee apple or ayee (Blighia sapida) is a fruit of the Sapindaceae (soapberry) family, as are the lychee and the longan. It is native to tropical West Africa. The scientific name honours Captain William Bligh who took the fruit from Jamaica to the Royal Botanic Gardens in Kew, England, in 1793. The English common name is derived from the West African Akan akye fufo.

Although having a long-held reputation as being poisonous with potential fatalities, the fruit arils are renowned as delicious when ripe, prepared properly, and cooked and are a feature of various Caribbean cuisines. Ackee is the national fruit of Jamaica and is considered a delicacy.

Botany
Ackee is an evergreen tree that grows about 10 metres tall, with a short trunk and a dense crown. The inflorescences are fragrant, up to 20 cm long, with unisexual flowers that bloom during warm months. Each flower has five greenish-white petals, which are fragrant.

The fruit is pear-shaped and has 3 lobes (2–4 lobes are common). When it ripens it turns from green to a bright red to yellow-orange and splits open to reveal three large, shiny black seeds, each partly surrounded by soft, creamy or spongy, white to yellow flesh — the aril having a nut-like flavor and texture of scrambled eggs. The fruit typically weighs . The tree can produce fruit throughout the year, although January–March and October–November are typically periods of fruit production.

Cultivars
There are up to as many as forty-eight cultivars of ackee, which are grouped into either "butter" or "cheese" types. The cheese type is pale yellow in color and is more robust and finds use in the canning industry. The butter type is deeper yellow in color, and is more delicate and better suited for certain cuisine.

History and culinary use

Imported to Jamaica from West Africa before 1773, the use of ackee in Jamaican cuisine is prominent. Ackee is the national fruit of Jamaica, whilst ackee and saltfish is the official national dish of Jamaica.

The ackee is allowed to open fully before picking in order to eliminate toxicity. When it has "yawned" or "smiled", the seeds are discarded and the fresh, firm arils are parboiled in salted water or milk, and may be fried in butter to create a delicious dish. In Caribbean cooking, they may be cooked with codfish and vegetables, or may be added to stew, curry, soup or rice with seasonings.

Nutrition 
Ackee contains a moderate amount of carbohydrates, protein, and fat, providing 51-58% of the dry weight of the arils as composed of fatty acids – linoleic, palmitic, and stearic acids. The raw fruit is a rich source of vitamin C.

Society and culture 
The ackee is prominently featured in the Jamaican mento style folksong "Linstead Market". In the song, a market seller laments, "Carry mi ackee go a Linstead market. Not a quattie worth sell".
The Beat's 1982 album Special Beat Service includes the song "Ackee 1-2-3".

Toxicity

The unripened aril and the inedible portions of the fruit contain hypoglycin toxins including hypoglycin A and hypoglycin B, known as "soapberry toxins". Hypoglycin A is found in both the seeds and the arils, while hypoglycin B is found only in the seeds. Minimal quantities of the toxin are found in the ripe arils. In the unripe fruit, depending on the season and exposure to the sun, the concentrations may be up to 10 - 100 times greater.

These two molecules are converted in the body to methylenecyclopropylacetic acid (MCPA), and are toxic with potential lethality. MCPA and hypoglycin A inhibit several enzymes involved in the breakdown of acyl CoA compounds, often binding irreversibly to coenzyme A, carnitine and carnitine acyltransferase I and II, reducing their bioavailability and consequently inhibiting beta oxidation of fatty acids.  Glucose stores are consequently depleted leading to hypoglycemia, and to a condition called Jamaican vomiting sickness. These effects occur only when the unripe aril (or an inedible part of the fruit) is consumed.

Though ackee is used widely in traditional dishes, research on its potential hypoglycin toxicity has been sparse and preliminary, requiring evaluation in well-designed clinical research to better understand its pharmacology, food uses, and methods for detoxification.

In 2011, it was found that as the fruit ripens, the seeds act as a sink whereby the hypoglycin A in the arils convert to hypoglycin B in the seeds. In other words, the seeds help in detoxifying the arils, bring the concentration of hypoglycin A to a level which is generally safe for consumption.

Commercial use
Ackee canned in brine is a commodity item and is used for export by Jamaica, Haiti and Belize. If propagated by seed, trees will begin to fruit in 3 – 4 years. Cuttings may yield fruit in 1 – 2 years.

Other uses
The fruit has various uses in West Africa and in rural areas of the Caribbean Islands, including use of its "soap" properties as a laundering agent or fish poison. The fragrant flowers may be used as decoration or cologne, and the durable heartwood used for construction, pilings, oars, paddles and casks. In African traditional medicine, the ripe arils, leaves or bark were used to treat minor ailments.

Vernacular names in African languages

References

External links

Ackee and saltfish: Jamaica's breakfast of champions – BBC Travel

Potentially dangerous food
Jamaican cuisine
National symbols of Jamaica
Fruit vegetables
Tropical fruit
Fruits originating in Africa
Flora of West Tropical Africa
Trees of Africa
Sapindaceae
Plants described in 1806